Hrangkhawl are one of [[Old Kuki subtribes and also one of the 21 scheduled tribes of Tripura  state of India. They are mainly dwelling in the Teliamura sub-division of West Tripura  and the Ambassa sub-division of Dhalai  districts. Hrangkhawls are also found in the North Cachar Hills of Dima Hasao district, Assam. They speak the  Hrangkhawl dialect of Chin-Kuki-Mizo language which is of Tibeto-Burmese origin.

See also
 Tripuri people
 Kokborok
 Mizo people
 List of Scheduled Tribes in India

Scheduled Tribes of India
Ethnic groups in Tripura
West Tripura district
Dhalai district
Dima Hasao district